The 2022 Clemson Tigers softball team was the varsity college softball team that represented Clemson University during the 2022 NCAA Division I softball season.  This was the third season of Clemson's softball program.  The Tigers competed in the Atlantic Coast Conference (ACC) and were led by head coach John Rittman.  Clemson played its home games at McWhorter Stadium in Clemson, South Carolina.

They finished the season 42–17 overall and 14–10 in ACC play to finish in fifth place. As the fifth seed in the ACC tournament, they earned a bye into the Quarter finals where they defeated fourth seed Notre Dame. In the Semifinals they defeated first seed Virginia Tech, but fell to third seed Florida State in the Final. This marked the back-to-back appearances in the Final of the ACC Tournament in the program's first two full seasons. The Tigers were selected, via at-large bid, as the tenth overall seed in the NCAA tournament. They hosted a regional and were placed into the Stillwater Super Regional. Clemson lost both games in Stillwater to end their season.

The team was again lead by Valerie Cagle, who finished the season with 16 wins, 13 home runs, and a .308 batting average.  Cagle was named First Team All-ACC and to the NFCA All-American First Team.  This marked her second year in a row as a First Team All-ACC player and Clemson's first First Team All-American.  McKenzie Clark was named Second Team All-ACC, Alia Logoleo and Millie Thompson were named Third Team All-ACC and Aby Vieira was named to the All-Freshman Team.

Previous season 
The Tigers finished their first full season as a program 44–8 and 29–5 in ACC play to finish in first place and claim the regular season championship. They earned an at-large bid to the NCAA tournament and were placed into the Tuscaloosa Regional. There they defeated Troy twice, but lost to Alabama twice to end their season.

Personnel

Roster

Coaches

Schedule

Note: All rankings shown are from the NFCA/USA Today poll.

Rankings 

 Various polls did not release during the NCAA tournament.  * indicates that the ranking is from pre-tournament for comparison purposes.

References

Clemson
Clemson softball
Clemson Tigers softball seasons
Clemson